Plato is a 2008 Russian comedy-drama film directed by Vartan Akopyan.

Plot
Fashionable metropolitan party-goer, "seller of happiness" Plato, earns money by finding the most beautiful girls in Russia on all sorts of castings and offers them to rich people who are willing to pay a large sum of money for a girl. Due to his attractive appearance and outstanding intellectual abilities, Plato always achieves his goal, until one day he meets Lyuba, a saleswoman in a fashion store. A romance develops between them but one of the most important clients of Plato, oligarch Abdul, asks him to arrange a meeting with Lyuba. Plato offers Lyuba a deal – both in order to make money and to satisfy Abdul, and she accepts. Lyuba's meeting with Abdul takes place where she sets her condition - the murder of one person, namely, Plato. Abdul agrees to satisfy this whim of the girl, but later Lyuba disowns this idea. Lyuba marries Abdul, becomes one of his wives and moves to his house in London.

Plato continues to do his job, wheeling the city in search of promising girls, but can not forget Lyuba. And one day he decides to find Abdul and goes to visit him, where he finds Lyuba, who is perfectly happy and does have any romantic feelings for him.

Cast
Pavel Volya — Plato
Elizaveta Lotova — Lyuba
Evelyn Bledans — Ellochka
Olegar Fedoro — man
Stanislav Bondarenko — Banderas
Ksenia Knyazeva — Nastya
Alexander Lymarev — Anton
Mukhtar Gusengadzhiev — Abdul
Alexei Grishin is an oligarch
Patimat Davydova — Patimat
Oleg Kamenshchikov — Pit Bull
Ekaterina Strogova — a girl from Bryansk
Olga Smirnova — a girl from Bryansk

References

External links
 

2008 comedy-drama films
2008 films
Russian comedy-drama films